Oseguera or Osaguera is a European surname originating in Spain. Some individuals possessing the name in what were once Spanish colonies and today independent republics in the Americas are:
Antonio Oseguera Cervantes (born 1958), suspected Mexican drug lord 
Elsa Oseguera (born 1993), Honduran journalist
Joaquín Esteban Osaguera Peña, Mexican medical researcher 
José Luis Soto Oseguera (born 1974), Mexican politician 
Luis Oseguera (born 1976), Honduran football striker
Nemesio Oseguera Cervantes (born 1966), suspected Mexican drug lord, brother of Antonio 
Rubén Oseguera González (born 1990), suspected Mexican drug lord, son of Nemesio

Spanish-language surnames